The 2019 Indy Lights season was the 34th season of the Indy Lights open wheel motor racing series and the 18th sanctioned by IndyCar, acting as the primary support series for the IndyCar Series. Oliver Askew won a tight championship race with Rinus Veekay. Askew won seven races to Veekay's six. Toby Sowery, Robert Megennis, and Ryan Norman each captured a single race win as did Aaron Telitz, who only participated in seven mid-season races, and Zachary Claman, who won the season opener but dropped out of the series after six races due to funding issues. Julien Falchero also dropped out of the season after four races after expected good results failed to materialize. Jarett Andretti made his first and only Indy Lights start in the Freedom 100 and set fastest lap on his way to a sixth place finish. Dalton Kellett moved onto IndyCar after this season despite only registering a single podium finish in 2019 Indy Lights.

The subsequent 2020 Indy Lights season would end up being canceled due to the Impact of the COVID-19 pandemic on sports.

Team and driver chart

1BN Racing became HMD Motorsports in August 2019

Schedule

Race results

Championship standings

Drivers' Championship

Scoring system

 The driver who qualifies on pole is awarded one additional point.
 An additional point is awarded to the driver who leads the most laps in a race.

Teams' championship
Scoring system

Single car teams receive 3 bonus points as an equivalency to multi-car teams
Only the best two results count for teams fielding more than two entries

See also
2019 IndyCar Series
2019 Indy Pro 2000 Championship
2019 U.S. F2000 National Championship

References

External links 
 

Indy Lights seasons
Indy Lights
Indy Lights